André Kaden (born 30 August 1978) is a German former competitive figure skater. He represented Germany at the 1996 World Junior Championships in Brisbane, Australia, and reached the final segment. He placed 7th in his qualifying group, 21st in the short program, 18th in the free skate, and 20th overall. He competed at three senior Grand Prix events and placed fourth at the 2002 German Championships.

Programs

Competitive highlights 
GP: Grand Prix; JGP: Junior Series/Junior Grand Prix

References

External links 
 

1978 births
German male single skaters
Living people
Figure skaters from Berlin
20th-century German people
21st-century German people